Tina Carver (March 24, 1922 – February 18, 1982) was an American film actress and model active in the 1950s.

Filmography

Feature films
The Man Who Turned to Stone (1957) as Big Marge
Chain of Evidence (1957) as Claire Ramsey
From Hell It Came (1957) as Dr. Terry Mason
Inside Detroit (1956) as Joni Calvin
Hell on Frisco Bay (1956) as Bessie
The Harder They Fall (1956) as Nick's wife
Uranium Boom (1956) as Gail Windsor
A Cry in the Night (1956) as Marie Holzapple
A Bullet for Joey (1955) as Counter girl

TV films
Surfside 6	(1960) as guest star	
Mr. Lucky (1960) as guest star	
Bronco (1959) as guest star	
The Thin Man (1958) as Mrs. Tyson
Perry Mason (1958) as Sylvia Bain	
G.E. Theater (1954)  as Clarice Stokes

References

External links
 
 

1922 births
1982 deaths
20th-century American actresses
American female models
American film actresses
American television actresses